Highest is the fourth studio album by Ghanaian rapper Sarkodie. It was released on September 8, 2017, by Sarkcess Music. The album comprises 19 tracks, including three interludes. Primarily produced by Jayso, it features guest appearances from Suli Breaks, Jesse Jagz, Bobii Lewis, Jayso, Moelogo, Korede Bello, Flavour, Yung L, Runtown and Victoria Kimani.

Background
Highest is an inspirational album released by the rapper. He gained inspiration from his daughter Titi, who he said brought him happiness and changed him from who he was. Titi's image is featured on the album's cover art.

Released signing
After releasing the album on digital platforms, Sarkodie organized an autograph signing session at the West Hills Mall in Accra on Sunday, September 10, 2017.

Accolades

Track listing

Release history

References

Sarkodie (rapper) albums
2017 live albums